Madzlan Gampong is a Filipino volleyball player who plays for Sarawak Hornbill of the Malaysia Volleyball League.

Career

College
A native of Simunul, Tawi-Tawi, Gampong played for the National University (NU) NU Bulldogs volleyball team at the University Athletic Association of the Philippines (UAAP). He was the topscorer for the Bulldogs in UAAP Season 77. At the start of UAAP Season 80, Gampong was a frequently part of the bench until he was fielded as a starter in the game against the Ateneo Blue Eagles which also marked as the end of NU's losing streak against Ateneo since Season 76.

Club

Team Dasma Monarchs
Gampong played for Team Dasma Monarchs in the 2021 PNVF Champions League. He helped the Monarchs clinch the inaugural men's title.

Sarawak Hornbill
Madzlan Gampong was signed in to play for the Sarawak Hornbill at 2022 Malaysia Volleyball League (MVL) Championships as one of the club's foreign players. He got recommended by fellow Filipino and signee Jayvee Sumagaysay since the club needed an outside hitter.

References

People from Tawi-Tawi
National University (Philippines) alumni
Filipino men's volleyball players
Outside hitters
Year of birth missing (living people)
Living people